Waimumu is a rural settlement town in the Gore District and Southland Region of New Zealand's South Island. It is located west of Gore, about 14 kilometres from the main township. Waimumu School operated from 1888 to c.1996.

The settlement hosts the Southern Field Days, a biennial agricultural trade show. It is held across a  site, attracting about 700 exhibitors and 40,000 attendees.

History

Europeans began farming either side of the Waimumu Stream in the 19th century. By 1901, the Waimumu Hundreds settlement had 608 people, and a public school with 21 students which held Presbyterian church services every month.

Gold was also discovered by boring, leading to the establishment of a steady gold-dredging industry. By 1906, some farming paddocks had been completely destroyed through gold dredging.

The Southern Field Days began in 1982, on a local farm, with 60 exhibitors.

In 2002, the New Zealand Government provided funding to the protect the unlogged area of the Māori-owned Hokonui-Waimumu block. In 2005, the Waimumu Trust, which administers the land, unsuccessfully challenged a ban on exporting timber from the forest through the Waitangi Tribunal.

Demographics
It surrounds but does not include Mataura and  borders Gore on the west, south and east.

Waimumu-Kaiwera had a population of 1,302 at the 2018 New Zealand census, an increase of 24 people (1.9%) since the 2013 census, and an increase of 69 people (5.6%) since the 2006 census. There were 474 households. There were 693 males and 609 females, giving a sex ratio of 1.14 males per female. The median age was 41.4 years (compared with 37.4 years nationally), with 288 people (22.1%) aged under 15 years, 213 (16.4%) aged 15 to 29, 633 (48.6%) aged 30 to 64, and 168 (12.9%) aged 65 or older.

Ethnicities were 95.6% European/Pākehā, 5.5% Māori, 1.2% Pacific peoples, 1.8% Asian, and 1.2% other ethnicities (totals add to more than 100% since people could identify with multiple ethnicities).

The proportion of people born overseas was 7.4%, compared with 27.1% nationally.

Although some people objected to giving their religion, 38.9% had no religion, 51.6% were Christian and 1.6% had other religions.

Of those at least 15 years old, 150 (14.8%) people had a bachelor or higher degree, and 231 (22.8%) people had no formal qualifications. The median income was $41,100, compared with $31,800 nationally. 213 people (21.0%) earned over $70,000 compared to 17.2% nationally. The employment status of those at least 15 was that 621 (61.2%) people were employed full-time, 198 (19.5%) were part-time, and 12 (1.2%) were unemployed.

References

Populated places in Southland, New Zealand
Gore District, New Zealand